Champaran meat, also known as ahuna, handi meat or batlohi, is a dish with its root from Champaran,a district of Bihar. Meat is marinated in a mix of mustard oil and ghee, garlic, onions, ginger  with the paste of spices.  The mouth of the handi (earthenware pot) is sealed with kneaded flour.  It is cooked slowly on a low flame of a wood fire and tossed continuously while cooking. The taste and cooking time depend on the quality of meat.

References

Bihari cuisine
Indian meat dishes